The 2012 Asia Series was the sixth time the Asia Series was held. The tournament was held in Busan, South Korea, and began on 8 November 2012 with the Final held on 12 November.

The tournament included six teams, a two team increase from the previous tournament. As has been the case in previous tournaments, the winners of NPB's 2012 Japan Series, Korea Baseball Organization's (KBO) 2012 Korean Series, Chinese Professional Baseball League's (CPBL) 2012 Taiwan Series and the Australian Baseball League's 2012 Championship Series qualified. The China Baseball League (CBL) returned to the Asia Series, with the 2012 Champion representing the country, and the host team, Busan's Lotte Giants, also participated in the tournament.

Participating teams

Format 
The six teams are placed in two groups of three (see below), with each team playing two games - one against each other member of their group. The team with the best record in each group will advance to the Final.

Round-robin stage

Group A

Group B

Final

See also 
 2011–12 Australian Baseball League season
 2012 Chinese Professional Baseball League season
 2012 Korea Baseball Organization season
 2012 Nippon Professional Baseball season

References

External links 
 Official Website
 Official Facebook

 

Asia Series
2012 in baseball
2012 in South Korean sport
Sports competitions in Busan
International baseball competitions hosted by South Korea
Asia Series